Pomeranchuk's theorem, named after Soviet physicist Isaak Pomeranchuk, states that difference of cross sections of interactions of elementary particles  and  (i. e. particle  with particle , and with its antiparticle ) approach 0 when , where  is the energy in center of mass system.

See also
 Pomeron

References 
  .

Physics theorems
Scattering theory